Holburn West Church is a congregation of the Church of Scotland.  It is located at the intersection Ashley Park Drive and the Great Western Road, in the west end of Aberdeen, Scotland. The church building was opened for worship in October 1894.  The Sanctuary and entrance to the church was refurbished in 2004.

The church has a choir that is under the patronage of The Duchess of Kent. The Organist and Choirmaster is James G.R. Campbell. The organ was built in 1922, by Abbott and Smith and overhauled in 1974 by N.P. Mander.

See also
 List of Church of Scotland parishes

References
 Mair, M. (1993),  Holburn West Parish Church: The First 100 Years Centenary Brochure 1893 - 1993. Holburn West Church: Aberdeen.

External links
 Official site

Category B listed buildings in Aberdeen
Listed churches in Scotland
Churches in Aberdeen
Church of Scotland churches in Scotland
Religious organizations established in 1894
19th-century churches in the United Kingdom